Neil Roberto Williams (born 20 July 1978), known by his stage name Roberto, is a British radio presenter, television presenter, voice-over artist and DJ.

Williams was born in London. He currently presents the breakfast show on Heart 80s from Heart FM owned by Global Radio, under the stage name 'Roberto'. Prior to Heart FM, he hosted mid mornings on the Capital FM Network.

Early life
Born and raised in Enfield, North London, Williams is the younger of two children. He was educated at an all boys school, Friern Barnet Grammar School, in Friern Barnet, London. Later, he studied Hospitality Management at Thames Valley University in Ealing, followed by a radio training course at Town FM in North London. Since then, he has continued to present in radio. After losing over ten stone in weight he moved into television presenting and qualified as a personal trainer.

Career
Williams started his radio career in August 1999 at Town FM in North London, a local community radio station. His first show was early breakfast between 4 and 6 am. After a few months, he was promoted to presenting breakfast. Both positions were unpaid, so whilst presenting both shows, he worked at T.G.I. Friday's in Enfield as a waiter and bartender.

Following a period at Town FM, Williams moved to Mercury 96.6 in Watford (now Heart Hertfordshire) as a cover presenter. This led to his first full-time show in commercial radio, presenting mid-mornings on Chiltern FM (now Heart Four Counties). From there he moved to Oxfordshire to present on Fox FM (now Heart Thames Valley), this was then followed by a move to Birmingham to present on BRMB (now Free Radio.)

Roberto
In 2008, Neil hosted his first show on Capital FM in London, covering Sunday evening 7 till 10 pm. He only did one show by his own name. The next week he presented the show as his stage name 'Roberto', he has been called that name ever since.

During his time at Capital FM, Roberto hosted afternoons (1-4pm) followed by mid-mornings (10am–1pm). He also achieved the most listened to mid-morning show in London. Roberto was part of the team that took Capital FM national in 2011 and also interviewed music stars like Tinie Tempah, Justin Bieber, JLS, Jessie J and Enrique Iglesias.

In 2012, Roberto joined the Heart Network, also owned by Global Radio, hosting the national evening show and Non-Stop Club Classics every Friday and Saturday nights. He stepped down from evenings on Heart in January 2017 ahead of launching the weekday breakfast and Saturday late-morning show on sister station Heart 80s from March of that year. His two shows (mention above) were then taken over by Sian Welby in 16 January and Annaliese Dayes four days later respectively.

Roberto has also been involved in television programmes for Channel 4, ITV and Sky.

Voice over
Williams is a male voice-over artist with his own home studio. Clients include Sky 1, The Sun, BMW, McLaren, British Airways and ESPN.

DJ
Throughout his career, Williams has DJ'd and hosted at events and nightclubs in London, Mallorca, Toronto, Miami and Los Angeles. Clients include London Fashion Week, Clyde & Co, CapCo, DSTRKT, ASOS and Tiger Tiger.

Weight loss
At his biggest, Williams weighed 23 and a half stone. He had been 'big' since a young age and carried the weight into adult life. A break up with a partner inspired him into losing weight, and since then he has lost over 10 stone. Most of that weight was lost within six months, in an unconventional way that involved doing no cardiovascular fitness or bariatric surgery.

Charity work
Born with a hole in his Heart, Williams has been a supporter of the British Heart Foundation throughout his career, taking part in charity events including the London to Brighton Bike Ride, a skydive and numerous running events.

In 2009, Williams swam the Thames in the Great Swim for Help A Capital Child. In 2011 he ran the Virgin London Marathon and the Royal Parks Foundation Half Marathon, again for Help a Capital Child.

References

External links
 Roberto Official Website
 Roberto Google+ Page
 Roberto Heart FM

1978 births
Living people
People from Edmonton, London
People educated at Friern Barnet Grammar School
British television presenters
British radio presenters
Heart (radio network)
Capital (radio network)
British DJs